The Wonsan International Friendship Air Festival or Wonsan Air Festival is an air show first held in September 2016 at Kalma Airport in Wonsan, North Korea.

2016
At the 2016 edition the Korean People's Army Air Force displayed a number of its aircraft, including Su-25, MiG-21 and MiG-29 combat aircraft. In addition Tu-134, Tu-154, An-24, Il-62 and Il-76 aircraft of Air Koryo, the North Korean national airline, also participated. Around 10,000-15,000 local spectators watched the show, as did a number of international journalists and around 200  international aviation enthusiasts.

2017
Initially there were plans to hold the air show every two years, but in March 2017 it was announced that a second edition of the air show would be held between 23 and 24 September 2017. It was announced that the MiG-23 fighter would appear.

In August 2017, a month before the event, the 2017 edition of the show was cancelled for "geopolitical reasons".

References

External links

Air shows
Aviation in North Korea
2016 establishments in North Korea